Kafoumba Coulibaly (born 26 October 1985) is an Ivorian former professional footballer who played as a midfielder.

Career
Coulibaly, a defensive midfielder, began his career at the famous Ivorian club ASEC Abidjan, in their youth academy run by former French international Jean-Marc Guillou. In 2004, he followed the well-trodden path from his homeland club to Belgian Jupiler League side K.S.K. Beveren, before spending time playing in Thailand for first Chonburi FC, then for BEC Tero.

In 2007, he moved to French Ligue 2 outfit SC Bastia, and after an impressive debut season in the French league, he was signed by Côte d'Azur-based Ligue 1 outfit OGC Nice, joining his compatriot, and former Ivorian international Emerse Faé. In August 2012, Coulibaly signed a three-year contract with Turkish Süper Lig club Kasımpaşa S.K., which was then terminated in mutual agreement in January 2015.

International career
He is part of the Ivorian squad for the 2008 Olympics in Beijing, China.

On 22 June 2008, he was part of the senior Ivorian squad for the 2010 World Cup qualifier against Botswana, but was an unused substitute, as the Elephants ran out 4–0 winners. Finally, he received his first cap in the 2010 FIFA World Cup qualification match against Mozambique on 7 September 2008.

Career statistics

International
Source:

Honors
Ivory Coast
Africa Cup of Nations runner-up:2012

References

External links
 
 
 
 

1985 births
Living people
Footballers from Abidjan
Association football midfielders
Ivorian footballers
Ivory Coast international footballers
ASEC Mimosas players
K.S.K. Beveren players
Kafoumba Coulibaly
Kafoumba Coulibaly
SC Bastia players
OGC Nice players
Kasımpaşa S.K. footballers
CA Bastia players
Ligue 1 players
Ligue 2 players
Süper Lig players
2012 Africa Cup of Nations players
Footballers at the 2008 Summer Olympics
Olympic footballers of Ivory Coast
Ivorian expatriate footballers
Expatriate footballers in France
Expatriate footballers in Belgium
Expatriate footballers in Thailand
Expatriate footballers in Turkey
Ivorian expatriate sportspeople in France
Ivorian expatriate sportspeople in Belgium
Ivorian expatriate sportspeople in Thailand
Ivorian expatriate sportspeople in Turkey